Any Old Port! is an American 1932 pre-Code comedy short film directed by James W. Horne and starring Laurel and Hardy. It was produced by Hal Roach.

Plot
Sailors Laurel and Hardy disembark and book in a sleazy hotel. The owner Mugsie Long intends to marry a young girl – the hotel's maid – against her wishes, but Stan and Ollie come to her rescue. Mugsie is tough and intimidating – billiard balls thrown at his head bounce off with no effect – but the pair finally trap his neck in an extending table while the girl escapes. After fleeing the hotel, the boys find out they've left their money in their room, but an old pal of Ollie's offers $50 if Ollie will fight in a boxing ring that night. Ollie agrees, but predictably makes Stan the fighter and himself the manager.

Stan enters the ring and discovers that his opponent is Mugsie himself. Knowing how tough Mugsie is, Ollie makes a seemingly wise bet with a drunk on Mugsie to win. Meanwhile, Mugsie is enraged at seeing Stan again, and loads his glove with metal before the fight begins. However, during the course of the fight, Mugsie and Stan accidentally switch gloves, causing Mugsie to comically run away from Stan knowing he has the loaded glove. Stan, who realizes the glove is loaded, gets the temporary advantage and chases Mugsie. Stan wins the fight when Mugsie tries to pull the loaded glove off Stan's hand and winds up knocking himself out. Mugsie's second calls a policeman and tells him Stan had been fighting with a loaded glove. Ollie is forced to give the drunk the money they received for entering the fight, and explains to Stan, "I bet on you to lose and you double-crossed me!" Stan, enraged at his own buddy and manager betting against him, draws his fist back to punch Ollie, and accidentally knocks out the policeman investigating the loaded glove still on Stan's hand. Stan and Ollie flee the stadium in terror.

OPENIING TITLE CARD

"The boys are back from a whaling voyage.Mr.Hardy was head harpooner.Mr.Laurel went along as bait".

Cast

External links

 
 
 The Sons of the Desert: International Laurel & Hardy Club (Oasis #249 - Jacksonville-Florida), AnyOldPort.com
 Any Old Port, facebook.com

1932 films
1932 comedy films
American black-and-white films
American boxing films
Films directed by James W. Horne
Laurel and Hardy (film series)
Films with screenplays by H. M. Walker
1930s English-language films
1930s American films